Nyctibatrachus manalari, the Manalar night frog, is a species of frog in the family Nyctibatrachidae. It was discovered in the Western Ghats along with six other species in its genus.

Etymology 
The specific name manalari refers to Upper Manalar in the Periyar Tiger Reserve, which is the type locality.

Description 
The frog has a small head, which is wider than it is long. The tympanum is indistinct. Adult males measure  in snout–vent length. The dorsum is reddish-brown.

Behaviour 
The males of the species were recorded calling during 7–9 pm, and also during the day at 2 pm. One of the males was located next to an egg clutch of 8 eggs next to ground vegetation.

Habitat and distribution 
The frog is so far known only from the type locality in the Western Ghats.

References 

manalari
Frogs of India
Endemic fauna of the Western Ghats
Taxa named by Sathyabhama Das Biju
Amphibians described in 2017